Cinnamosma is a genus of plants in family Canellaceae described as a genus in 1867.

Cinnamosma is endemic to Madagascar.

Species
 Cinnamosma fragrans Baill.
 Cinnamosma macrocarpa H.Perrier
 Cinnamosma madagascariensis Danguy

References

Canellaceae
Canellales genera
Endemic flora of Madagascar
Taxa named by Henri Ernest Baillon